Margaret Lavinia Anderson is professor emerita at University of California Berkeley where she teaches about Europe since 1453; Central Europe from the late 18th century, especially modern Germany; World War I; Fascist Europe. She won a 2001 Berlin prize by the American Academy in Berlin, and was a 2008 Guggenheim Fellow. She was a fellow at Stanford Humanities Center.

Life
Her research is about political culture, including electoral politics, in Imperial Germany and in comparative European perspective; the intersection of religion and politics; religion and society–especially Catholicism in the 19th century. She is now working on the relations (on the level of governments as well as civil society) between Germany and the Ottoman Empire from the time of the Hamidian massacres of the Ottoman Armenians in 1894-1896 to c. 1933. She was on the Academic Advisory Council of the German Historical Institute.

She completed her Ph.D. at Brown University and her B.A. at Swarthmore College.

She is married to James J. Sheehan, a historian at Stanford University.

Selected works 
Windthorst: A Political Biography. Oxford University Press, 1981, 
Windthorst: Zentrumspolitiker und Gegenspieler Bismarcks. Droste, 1988, 

 Review article "Piety and Politics: Recent Work on German Catholicism," The Journal of Modern History Vol. 63, No. 4, December 1991

"Voter, Junker, Landrat, Priest: The Old Authorities and the new Franchise in Imperial Germany, 1871-1914," American Historical Review, Volume 98, Issue 5 (December 1993): pages 1448-1474
"The Limits of Secularization: On the Problem of the Catholic Revival in 19th Century Germany," Historical Journal, 38, 3 (95): 647-670
"Clerical Election Influence and Communal Solidarity: Catholic Political Culture in the German Empire, 1871-1914," Elections before Democracy. Essays on the Electoral History of Latin America and Europe, Macmillan (NY, New York and London, Eng), 96
 "'Down in Turkey, far away': Human Rights, the Armenian Massacres, and Orientalism in Wilhelmine Germany," The Journal of Modern History Vol. 79, No. 1, March 2007
"The Divisions of the Pope: The Catholic Revival and Europe's Transition to Democracy," Rivals and Revivals: Religion and politics in Nineteenth-Century Spanish America and Europe, forthcoming.

References

External links 
 University of California Berkeley, Department of History
History of Europe podcast

Living people
1941 births
Berlin Prize recipients
Writers from Washington, D.C.
Brown University alumni
Swarthmore College alumni
University of California, Berkeley College of Letters and Science faculty
Swarthmore College faculty
American women historians
21st-century American historians
21st-century American women
Historians from California